Gonodontodes chionosticta is a moth of the family Noctuidae first described by George Hampson in 1913. It is found on Jamaica.

References

Moths described in 1913
Catocalinae